Barnacle Bill is a 1941 feature film starring Wallace Beery.  The screen comedy was directed by Richard Thorpe. Barnacle Bill was the second of seven MGM films pairing Beery and character actress Marjorie Main.

Plot
Lazy fisherman Bill Johansen docks his small (and sinking) fishing boat in San Pedro harbor, aggravating ship chandler Pop Cavendish and Pop's spinster daughter Marge, who would like to marry Bill even though he has welched on paying his debts for years. Pop tries to have Bill's boat attached, but cannot because Bill has craftily listed the boat's ownership in the name of his daughter Virginia, whom he has not seen since she was a baby. Meanwhile, reefer ship-owner John Kelly has a monopoly and intimidates local fishermen into accepting less than market value for their fish. Marge tells Bill he is just the man to stand up to Kelly, but Bill would rather fish for swordfish, which bring a higher price (and thus require less work to earn beer money) with his partner, Pico. His daughter Virginia, now twelve, is brought to meet Bill by her Aunt Letty and asks to stay with him, even though Letty thinks he is an unfit father. Bill likes Virginia, but doesn't want the responsibility of raising a child, so he convinces Marge to let her live ashore with her.

Virginia and Marge decide to try to reform Bill. Bill attends church with them, but later shows up drunk for supper. Virginia tells Bill about the death of "Gramps," her maternal grandfather, who was a well-known Gloucester fishing schooner captain. Bill tells her his dream is to captain the We're Here, a Gloucester schooner docked in San Pedro, and Virginia gives him Gramps' captain's telescope as a symbol of the dream. To make it come true, Bill and Pico get a job on a tuna boat and return to find that Virginia and Marge have rehabilitated his rundown boat in the month he has been gone. When Bill collects his pay, he gets much less than expected and suspects that Kelly is cheating the fisherman by under-weighing the catch. Bill confronts one of Kelly's henchmen and cajoles a bribe to keep his "big mouth" shut. Bill is about to accept the money when he sees Virginia bringing the other cheated fishermen to watch him stand up to Kelly. To save face, Bill refuses the bribe and throws the henchman into the harbor. Virginia takes his wages for safekeeping, but Bill gets drunk anyway to celebrate his new status as a hero, and Kelly scuttles his boat after he passes out.

As Bill and Pico work to raise their boat, Virginia is horrified to see that the We're here is being sold at auction. Bill imprudently offers the highest bid. He uses his fishing money for a deposit and has ten days to pay off the balance. Bill wants to sail the We're Here to the South Sea Islands and charms Marge into giving him the money to pay the balance, hinting that they might get married. The other fishermen want Bill to convert the We're Here into a reefer ship and offer to finance it. Bill pretends to accept the offer, but uses it to leverage another bribe from Kelly, needing cash to buy goods for trade in the South Seas. Virginia discovers what is happening, and disillusioned, calls Aunt Letty to take her home. When Marge comes to get Virginia's clothes, Bill returns the telescope. A conscience-stricken Bill decides to keep his promise to the fishermen. Pop, an investor, comes aboard, and Marge stows away as cook to keep Bill honest. Bill arrives at the fishing grounds as Kelly is again trying to intimidate the fishermen and gives Kelly his money back. Kelly and his gang sneak aboard the fish-laden We're Here to scuttle her, but Pop discovers the invaders. Bill's makeshift crew capture the gang and put them to work to successfully weather a bad storm. Virginia and the telescope are waiting back at San Pedro. where Bill and a suddenly bashful Marge wed.

Cast

See also
The other six Wallace Beery and Marjorie Main films:
 Wyoming (1940)
 Jackass Mail (1942)
 The Bugle Sounds (1942)
 Rationing (1944)
 Bad Bascomb (1946)
 Big Jack (1949)

References

External links
 
 
 

1941 films
American black-and-white films
1940s English-language films
Films directed by Richard Thorpe
Films scored by Bronisław Kaper
Metro-Goldwyn-Mayer films
1941 comedy-drama films
American comedy-drama films
1940s American films